George Pack Jr. (1794 in Saint John, New Brunswick, Canada – April 15, 1875 in Pack's Mills, Michigan) was a businessman, landowner, sawmill operator, and postmaster on the Lower Peninsula of Michigan. The town of Pack's Mills of which he was also postmaster, was named after him. Pack's son, George Willis Pack; grandson, Charles Lathrop Pack; and great-grandson, Randolph Greene Pack were to follow him in the timber business in Michigan, New York and beyond.

Early life and family 

Pack had moved to Michigan from upstate New York, in 1848. Born in Canada, Pack had first moved to Jefferson County, New York, with his father, George Pack Sr., and 10 of his siblings, including brother John Pack.

From Jefferson County, Pack removed to Madison County, New York, to be near the parents of his wife, Maria Lathrop Pack. In search of new opportunities, he used proceeds from the sale of a farm near Watertown, New York, to purchase  just outside Lexington, Michigan.

With ten children in tow, George and Maria Pack boarded "an Erie Canal sidewheeler [and] rode it to the end of the line at Buffalo and from there headed up Lake Erie to Lake Huron, disembarking at Lexington, on the eastern shore of the Michigan thumb, overlooking Lake Huron", where they spent the next 13 years.

Business career 

It was while in Lexington, that Pack made his first investment in timber. He "paid $1,600 for 720 acres of timberland near the Black River. The acreage was located ten miles north of Lexington, near a town called Farmers, now known as Carsonville".

Pack opened his first sawmill in Washington Township, in 1856. The second was opened just a year later, in the same township. The town of Pack's Mills was established nearby. A grist mill and then a flour mill followed soon thereafter. By 1876, "sixteen hundred acres would be in the Pack name".

References

 Eyle, Alexandra. 1992. Charles Lathrop Pack: Timberman, Forest Conservationist, and Pioneer in Forest Education. Syracuse, NY: ESF College Foundation and College of Environmental Science and Forestry. Distributed by Syracuse University Press. Available:  Google books

Notes

1794 births
1875 deaths
Businesspeople in timber
History of forestry in the United States
Businesspeople from Saint John, New Brunswick
People from Sanilac County, Michigan
People from Peterboro, New York
People from Watertown, New York
Emigrants from pre-confederation New Brunswick to the United States